Victodrobia victoriensis is a species of very small freshwater snail with an operculum, an aquatic gastropod mollusc in the family Hydrobiidae. This species is endemic to Australia.

References

Gastropods of Australia
Victodrobia
Taxonomy articles created by Polbot